Jovana Jović (née Jakšić; 30 September 1993) is a Serbian former professional tennis player. Jović won 17 singles titles and four doubles titles on the ITF Women's Circuit. On 12 May 2014, she reached her best singles ranking of world No. 102, after getting into the WTA tournament final in Monterrey. On 31 July 2017, she peaked at No. 204 in the doubles rankings.

Playing for Serbia Fed Cup team, Jović has a win–loss record of 2–3. She made her Fed Cup debut in February 2014, losing to Canada's Eugenie Bouchard in straight sets in their World Group II tie, but winning the dead doubles rubber the following day.

On 17 November 2019, she married her long-time boyfriend Vujadin Jović.

Jović stepped away from professional tennis in March 2021 and announced her retirement on 5 March 2022.

Career

2013

Jović made her debut on the WTA Tour, qualifying for the main draw of the Monterrey Open and defeating Vera Dushevina in the first round. She lost in the second round to the third seed Maria Kirilenko in three sets.

2014
Jović reached her first career WTA final at the Monterrey Open, losing to fellow Serb Ana Ivanovic in straight sets. In May, she made her Grand Slam main-draw debut at the French Open, losing in the first round to 31st seed Daniela Hantuchová, in three sets. At Wimbledon, she lost to Petra Cetkovská in the first round, in three sets as well.

Performance timelines

Only main-draw results in WTA Tour, Grand Slam tournaments, Olympic Games and Fed Cup/Billie Jean King Cup are included in win–loss records.

Singles

WTA career finals

Singles: 1 (runner–up)

ITF Circuit finals

Singles: 28 (17 titles, 11 runner–ups)

Doubles: 8 (4 titles, 4 runner–ups)

Notes

References

External links

 
 
 

1993 births
Living people
Tennis players from Belgrade
Serbian female tennis players